Mauro Molina García (born 4 November 2001) is a Spanish footballer who plays as a winger for SD Ponferradina B.

Club career
Born in Magaz de Abajo, Camponaraya, Castile and León, Molina was a SD Ponferradina youth graduate, and made his senior debut with the reserves during the 2018–19 season, in the regional leagues. In the 2019 summer, he moved to CD Numancia and returned to youth setup.

On 28 July 2020, Molina joined Tercera División side Atlético Astorga FC. He featured sparingly before returning to Ponfe and their B-side in 2021.

Molina made his first team debut on 31 December 2021, coming on as a late substitute for Kike Saverio in a 0–2 Segunda División away loss against Real Oviedo.

References

External links

2001 births
Living people
People from El Bierzo
Sportspeople from the Province of León
Spanish footballers
Footballers from Castile and León
Association football wingers
Segunda División players
Tercera División players
Tercera Federación players
Divisiones Regionales de Fútbol players
SD Ponferradina B players
Atlético Astorga FC players
SD Ponferradina players